Julia Elliott is a writer of fiction, and winner of the 2012 Rona Jaffe Foundation Writers' Award for beginning women writers.

Elliott received her MFA from Penn State in 1996, and a Ph.D. from University of Georgia in 2012. Her debut short-story collection The Wilds was published by Tin House in 2014. In 2016 she was awarded the Shared Worlds Residency by Amazon.com. She teaches at University of South Carolina in Columbia.

References

Living people
Rona Jaffe Foundation Writers' Award winners
Pennsylvania State University alumni
University of Georgia alumni
University of South Carolina faculty
Year of birth missing (living people)